The Alexander and Rich Mountain Railway was a railway in West Virginia.

History 
The Alexander and Rich Mountain Railroad was sold by receivers November 27, 1899, and new company was formed December 29, 1899 as the Alexander and Rich Mountain Railway. The track was from Alexander, WV, to Switchback, WV 16 miles, Star to Right Fork 5 miles, and Morgan to Phillips Run, WV, 1 mile.

In 1901 the branch from Morgan to Phillips Run was abandoned. In 1903 H.T. Wilson was appointed receiver for the company and the Randolph Lumber and Coal Company with the court appointing F. T. Reese later that year.

C.H. Williams was listed as the 1st Vice President and General Manager.

December 1906, the company was again reorganized, this time becoming the Alexander and Eastern Railroad owned by the Croft Lumber Company.

Rolling stock and physical plant 
1900, gauge: 4 feet 8.5 inches, rail:  35 and 56 pound steel, 3 locomotives, 21 flat freight cars
1902, gauge 4 feet 8.5 inches, rail: 35 and 56 pound steel, 1 locomotive, 21 flat freight cars

Connections 
Connections existed to Baltimore & Ohio at Alexander, West Virginia

Board (1900) 
J.J.  Holloway, Wheeling, WV, President
D.C. List Jr., Wheeling, WV
J.B. Hart, Clarksburg, WV, Vice President
C. M. Hart, Clarksburg, WV, Secretary/Treasurer
H.T. Wilson, Clarksburg, WV, General Manager

General Offices 
The General Offices were in Clarksburg, WV

References

West Virginia railroads
1899 establishments in West Virginia
1906 establishments in West Virginia